Inter Aviation Services (Pty) Ltd, which traded as Interair South Africa, was a privately owned airline based in Johannesburg, South Africa. It operated scheduled passenger services from Johannesburg to regional destinations in Africa. Its main base was O. R. Tambo International Airport, Johannesburg.

History 
The airline was established, by Aeronautical Investments, as Inter Air Lines at Lanseria in 1979; it was renamed to Interair in 1993 and started operations in 1994. It initially operated domestic services, but these later ceased. Regional services were started in April 1995, and the airline ceased operations altogether in late August 2015, following the death of Executive Chairman David Tokoph on 18 August 2015.

Interair South Africa was a member of the International Air Transport Association (IATA/IOSA certified), and the African Airlines Association (AFRAA).

Corporate affairs

Ownership
The airline was owned by the late David P. Tokoph (who was also Chairman & Chief Executive Officer consecutively), J Attala, M Attala, P Attala (Executive Director), and had 191 employees (as at March 2012).

Business trends
Because it was a private company, annual reports were not published. In the absence of these, little information on trends is available, as shown below:

Destinations 
Interair South Africa appeared to operate services to the following international scheduled destinations (according to the company website), as of August 2015:

Codeshare agreements
As of June 2014, the airline had codeshare agreements with the following airlines:
Air Tanzania (Dar es Salaam–Johannesburg)

Fleet

The Interair South Africa fleet comprised the following aircraft (as of August 2017):

References

External links 

 

Defunct airlines of South Africa
Airlines established in 1993
Airlines disestablished in 2015
1993 establishments in South Africa
2015 disestablishments in South Africa
Companies based in Johannesburg